Ivan Seal (born 1973) is an English painter and sound artist who specializes in surreal and abstract works centered around concepts of memory and the creation of imagined objects. He is best known for his collaborations with electronic musician James Leyland Kirby, also known as The Caretaker, creating artwork for the critically-acclaimed albums: An Empty Bliss Beyond This World and the six part album series Everywhere at the End of Time, both of which examine themes of memory loss through the long-term mental decay brought about by dementia.

Biography

Early life 
Ivan Seal was born in Stockport, U.K. on an unknown date in 1973. Little is known about Seal's early life aside from attending Sheffield Hallam University from 1992 to 1995, during which Seal began to experiment with creating art installations using ambient music as a medium. During this period, Seal became close friends with another experimental musician from Stockport, James Leyland Kirby, who was creating music under the name "V/Vm". At some point following his studies, Seal moved to Berlin, Germany, where he currently resides.

Career 
Seal's first known exhibition was as a part of the 2006 "Anonymous" exhibition at the Schirn Kunsthalle in Frankfurt, Germany, in which he was one of 11 anonymous artists featured. Through the years between 2006 and 2010, Seal's ambient music installations and paintings were featured within group and solo exhibitions throughout the Berlin art scene. 

Ivan Seal held his first major solo exhibition "personality disorders" at the Carl Freedman Gallery in London starting in May of 2011.  Following his initial exhibition, Seal returned to showcase his works at the Carl Freedman Gallery in London in 2013, 2015, and 2021. Alongside these semi-regular exhibitions at the Carl Freedman Gallery in London, Seal's works have been exhibited in galleries across Europe and the United States.

Collaborations with James Leyland Kirby 
In June of 2011, James Leyland Kirby released his breakthrough album An Empty Bliss Beyond This World which featured Seal's 2010 work "happy in spite" as the album cover, giving both artists a large boost in popularity due to the critical acclaim for the album. Seal's art had been previously used by James Leyland Kirby for Persistent Repetition of Phrases, released in 2008, but the usage of "happy in spite" for An Empty Bliss Beyond This World resulted in a continued collaborative relationship between the two artists. In 2012, Seal's artwork was once again used by Kirby as the album cover for the soundtrack to Grant Gee's film Patience (After Sebald).

Ivan Seal and James Leyland Kirby's relationship is most well known due to the album artwork Seal created for Everywhere at the End of Time, a six-part album series released throughout 2016 to 2019 which was meant to musically emulate the mental decay caused by dementia and Alzheimer's disease.

References

External links
Ivan Seal at Carl Freedman Gallery, London
Ivan Seal at Carl Freedman Gallery, Margate
Ivan Seal at Monica de Cardenas Gallery, Milan
The Caretaker with Ivan Seal
Everywhere, an empty bliss

Living people
1973 births
Album-cover and concert-poster artists
20th-century English painters
English male painters
21st-century English painters
British conceptual artists
English contemporary artists
Alumni of Sheffield Hallam University
20th-century English male artists
21st-century English male artists